Zaman Kilic (born Ishøj, Denmark 26 August 2000), better known by his stage name ZK, is a Danish rapper.

He wrote his first contract with a 16-year-old named Ashkan at Sony Denmark and published the first single "Solskin". He started singing and rapping at a young age. When he was 11 years old, he made his first song on YouTube,  you can still find his songs from back then. ZK's fourth hit "Zum Zum" is streamed over 11 million times on Spotify and is his most streamed song. ZK went to the studio to make "Zum Zum" after he was told that two of his close friends were in prison. The song is his explanation of him and his friends' understanding of life and the ghetto life.

Discography

Albums

Singles

Other songs
"Varm indeni" (2017)
"Solskin" (2017)
"Drama" (2018)
"Bang Bang" (2018)

References

External links
Facebook

Danish rappers
2000 births
Living people
People from Ishøj Municipality